Richard Henry Moloney (born June 7, 1950), is a former American baseball player who pitched in the Major Leagues for one season in 1970 with the Chicago White Sox. He was the 3rd youngest player in the American league when he made his first and only appearance. He pitched one inning giving up two hits and striking out one (Jim Holt).

References

External links

1950 births
Major League Baseball pitchers
Chicago White Sox players
Living people
Baseball players from Massachusetts
Appleton Foxes players
Asheville Tourists players
Florida Instructional League White Sox players
Gulf Coast White Sox players
Mobile White Sox players
Tucson Toros players
Brookline High School alumni
Sportspeople from Brookline, Massachusetts